Sultan Abu Bakar Ri’ayatuddin Al-Mu’azzam Shah Ibni Al-Marhum Sultan Abdullah Al-Mu’tassim Billah Shah  (29 May 1904 – 5 May 1974), was the fourth modern Sultan of Pahang.

Life
Born on 29 May 1904 at Istana Hinggap, Pekan, he was the second son of Sultan Abdullah Al-Mu’tassim Billah Shah by his second wife, Kalsum binti Abdullah.

Succeeding his father in 1932, he quickly became known as a friendly and approachable ruler by his subjects. During the Japanese occupation of Malaya, he discreetly encouraged resistance movements such as the Askar Wataniah, Force 136 and the MPAJA.

However, due to his penchant for marrying commoners, including several popular actresses and singers, he was less popular with other Malay rulers and they declined to choose him as Yang di-Pertuan Agong of Malaysia in five separate times.

Family 
He was married to Tengku Ampuan Pahang Raja Fatimah, the daughter of Sultan Iskandar of Perak, in Kuala Kangsar, Perak. His marriage was a marriage between two royal relatives.

He died on 5 May 1974 at the Istana Peninjau, Kampung Padang Polo, Pekan at aged 69 and was succeeded by his son Sultan Ahmad Shah.

Honours

Honours of Pahang 
 Founding Grand Master of the Family Order of the Crown of Indra of Pahang (25 May 1967)
 Founding Grand Master of the Order of the Crown of Pahang (27 December 1968)

Honour of Malaya 
  : 
 Recipient of the Order of the Crown of the Realm (DMN) (31 August 1958)

Honour of other State
  :
 First Class of the Royal Family Order of Johor (DK I) (1965)
  :
 Member of the Royal Family Order of Kedah (DK) (1969)
  :
 Member of the  Royal Family Order of Perak (DK) (1970)

Foreign honours 
  :
 Honorary  Knight Grand Cross of the Order of St Michael and St George (GCMG) – Sir (1 June 1953)
  :
 Member of the Family Order of Seri Utama (DK) - Dato Seri Utama (1958)

References

Abu Bakar
Bakar, Sultan Abu
Bakar, Sultan Abu
Malaysian Muslims
Malaysian people of Malay descent
Malayan people of World War II
People from British Malaya
Bakar, Sultan Abu
20th-century Malaysian politicians
Recipients of the Order of the Crown of the Realm
First Classes of the Royal Family Order of Johor